Mount Ingalls is a mountain located in the Northern Sierra Nevada in California. Most of the precipitation that falls on the mountain is snow due to the high elevation.

See also 
 List of highest points in California by county

References

External links 
 

Mountains of the Sierra Nevada (United States)
Mountains of Plumas County, California
Mountains of Northern California